Sound studies is an interdisciplinary field that to date has focused largely on the emergence of the concept of "sound" in Western modernity, with an emphasis on the development of sound reproduction technologies. The field first emerged in venues like the journal Social Studies of Science by scholars working in science and technology studies and communication studies; it has however greatly expanded and now includes a broad array of scholars working in music, anthropology, sound art, deaf studies, architecture, and many other fields besides. Important studies have focused on the idea of a "soundscape", architectural acoustics, nature sounds, the history of aurality in Western philosophy and nineteenth-century Colombia, Islamic approaches to listening, the voice, studies of deafness, loudness, and related topics. A foundational text is Jonathan Sterne's 2003 book "The Audible Past", though the field has retroactively taken as foundational two texts, Jacques Attali's Noise: The Political Economy of Music (1985) and R. Murray Schafer's The Tuning of the World (The Soundscape) (1977).

Initial work in the field was criticized for focusing mainly on white male inventors in Euro-America. Consequently, the field is currently in a period of expansion, with important texts coming out in recent years on sound, listening, and hearing as they relate to race, gender, and colonialism.

Hearing and listening

Two significant categories to what we hear and pay attention to are natural and technological sounds. According to R. Murray Schafer (through a survey of quotes in the literature), the proportion of nature sounds heard and noticed among European authors has decreased over the past two centuries from 43% to 20%, but not for North America, where it has stayed around 50%. Additionally, the proportion of technological sounds mentioned in literature has stayed around 35% for Europe, but decreased in North America. While technological increases have not been sonically noticed, the decrease in silence has been noticed, from 19% to 9%.

For the idea of listening, objects can be considered auditorily as compared to visually. The objects that are able to be experienced by sight and by sound can be thought of in a venn diagram, with mute and visible objects in the vision category, with aural and invisible objects in the sound category, and aural and visible objects in the overlapping category. Objects that do not fall into a specific category can be considered beyond the horizons of sound and sight. The common denominator for aural objects is movement.

Three modes of listening have been articulated by sound theorist Michel Chion: causal listening, semantic listening, and reduced listening. Causal listening, the most common, consists of listening in order to gather information about the sound's source, or its cause. Sound in this case is informational and can be used to recognize voices, determine distance, or understand differences between humans and machines. Semantic listening is when one listens in order to understand the encoded meaning of the sound such as in speech or other sounds that are imbued with meaning such as morse code or user interface feedback sounds. Reduced listening focuses on the traits of the sound itself regardless of cause and meaning.

Jean-Luc Nancy's short book, Listening, distinguishes hearing from listening. Hearing is a sonic attentiveness to meaning and understanding while listening is a radical sonic receptivity to what is other and unexpected. "To be listening," he writes, "is always to be on the edge of meaning, or in an edge meaning of extremity."

For Nina Sun Eidsheim, especially in The Race of Sound, we are trained to listen for what we hear and as a result, what we hear affirms our initial expectations. In response, she calls for us to listen to our listening, and redirect our attention to ourselves, asking not what or who or what kind of subject I'm hearing, but "Who am I, who hears this?"

Spaces, sites and scapes

Sound is heard through space. But this defining of sound and space is further nuanced by their interdependent existence, creation, and dissolution. This idea of the acoustic environment and its social inextricability has become a source of interest within the field of sound studies. Critical to this contemporary discussion of the symbiotic social space and sonic space is R. Murray Schafer's concept of the soundscape. Schafer uses the term soundscape to describe "a total appreciation of the sonic environment," and, through soundscape studies, attempts to more holistically understand "the relationship between man and the sounds of his environment and what happens when those sounds change". In understanding the environment as events being heard, the soundscape is indicative of the social conditions and characteristics that create it. In industrialized cities, the soundscape is industrial noises, in a rainforest the soundscape is the sound of nature, and in an empty space the soundscape is silence. Moreover, the soundscape is argued to foretell future societal trends. The soundscape is not just representative of the environment which surrounds it; it comprises an essential part of the environment's perception and existence. The soundscape is the environment on a wavelength that is auditory rather than tactile or visible, but very much as real.

Schafer's concept of the soundscape has become a hallmark of sound studies and is referenced, built upon, and criticized by writers from a wide breadth of disciplines and perspectives. Common themes explored through the analysis of the soundscape are the conflict between nature and industry, the impact of technology on sound production and consumption, the issue of cultural sound values and the evolution of acoustics, and the power dynamics of silence and noise.

Transduce and record

Our perception of a recorded sound's authenticity has been greatly impacted by the commercial influence of capitalism. Even the dead now profit from recordings they've made, making music more timeless than ever before. Bringing the past into the present generates a sense of familiarity which compels the public to engage in new forms of listening.

In a Memorex commercial involving Ella Fitzgerald and Chuck Mangione, Fitzgerald is unable to discern the difference between a live performance and a recording of Mangione playing the trumpet. This presents a scene to viewers which sells cassette tapes as ideal objects of high-fidelity, auditory preservation. What was once an autonomic experience of memory which integrated visual and auditory stimuli (live music) has become a consumable item which popularizes and commodifies sonic memory explicitly.

Part of this shift in the dynamics of recorded sound has to do with a desire for noise reduction. This desire is representative of a mode of recording referred to by scholar James Lastra as "telephonic:" a mode in which sound is regarded as having hierarchically important qualities, with clarity and intelligibility being the most important aspects. This contrasts with phonographic recording, which generates a "point of audition" from which a sense of space can be derived, sacrificing quality for uniqueness and fidelity. This technique is often used in movies to demonstrate how a character hears something (such as muffled voices through a closed door). Through various forms of media, recorded music affects our perceptions and consumptive practices more often than we realize.

See also 
 Audiophile

References

Further reading
 R. Murray Schafer (1977), The Tuning of the World, (considered as the first contribution in sound studies.)
 R. Murray Schafer (1994), The soundscape. In The Soundscape: Our Sonic Environment and the Tuning of the World. Rochester, Vermont: Destiny Books. pp. 3–12
 Michael Doucet (1983), "Space, Sound, Culture, and Politics: Radio Broadcasting in Southern Ontario". Canadian Geographer / Le Géographe canadienVolume 27, Issue 2, pages 109–127, June 1983, 
 Jacques Attali (1985), Noise: The Political Economy of Music
 John Potts (1997), "Is There a Sound Culture?", Convergence: The International Journal of Research into New Media Technologies, December 1997, vol. 3 no. 4, pp. 10–14
 Trevor Pinch and Frank Trocco (2002),  Analog Days
 Thompson, Emily (2002), The Soundscape of Modernity: Architectural Acoustics and the Culture of Listening in America 1900-1930. Cambridge: MIT Press. pp. 1–12
 Jonathan Sterne (2003), The Audible Past
 Jonathan Sterne (ed.) (2012), The Sound Studies Reader
 Georgina Born (1995), Rationalizing Culture
 Georgina Born (ed.) (2013), Music, Sound and Space: Transformations of Public and Private Experience
 Peter Szendy (2007), Listen, A History of Our Ears (the original French version, Ecoute, une histoire de nos oreilles, was published in 2001)
 Michele Hilmes (2005), "Is There a Field Called Sound Culture Studies? And Does It Matter?", American Quarterly, Volume 57, Number 1, March 2005, pp. 249–259, 
 Holger Schulze & Christoph Wulf (2007), Klanganthropologie
 Holger Schulze (2008), Sound Studies
 special issue on "The Politics of Recorded Sound" by Social Text 102 (2010), edited by Gustavus Stadler.
 Veit Erlmann (2010), Reason and Resonance
 Trevor Pinch & Karin Bijsterveld (2011), Oxford Handbook of Sound Studies
 Florence Feiereisen & Alexandra Merley Hill (2011), Germany in the Loud Twentieth Century
 Kate Crawford (2009) "Following You: Disciplines of Listening in Social Media". Continuum: Journal of Media and Cultural Studies Volume 23, Issue 4, pp. 525–535
 Shuhei Hosokawa (1984), "The Walkman Effect", Popular Music 4:165-80
 James Lastra (2000), "Fidelity Versus Intelligibility" pp. 138–43. New York: Columbia University Press
   Goodman, Steve (2010) "The Ontology of Vibrational Force" Sonic Warfare: Sound, Affect and the Ecology of Fear Cambridge: MIT Press. pp 81-84
 Don Ihde (1974). The Auditory Dimension. In Listening and Voice: A Phenomenology of Sound. Athens: Ohio University Press. Pp. 49-55

 Michael Bull (2008) Sound Moves : iPod Culture and Urban Experience. London: Routledge. pp 39–49.
Meredith Ward (2019) 'Static in the System: Noise and the Soundscape of American Cinema Culture'. Berkeley and Los Angeles: University of California Press.
Justin St. Clair (2013). Sound and Aural Media in Postmodern Literature: Novel Listening. New York: Routledge.
Justin St. Clair (2022). Soundtracked Books from the Acoustic Era to the Digital Age: A Century of "Books that Sing."'' New York: Routledge.

External links
 European Sound Studies Association
A syllabus from a graduate seminar on Sound Studies taught by Jonathan Sterne in the fall of 2006.
Weird Vibrations, a sound studies blog.
Sounding Out!, a sound studies blog
Anthropology of Sound, a sound studies blog
Master of Arts: Sound Studies and Sonic Arts, study Sound Studies at the University of Arts Berlin
Sound Studies Lab, a research project on auditory culture at the Humboldt-University of Berlin

Musicology